Symmoca albicanella is a moth of the family Autostichidae. It is found in Croatia and Slovenia.

References

Moths described in 1868
Symmoca